Elisha Hurd Groves (November 5, 1797 – December 29, 1867), at times misidentified as Elisha B. Groves, was a 19th century mid-level leader in the Church of Jesus Christ of Latter-day Saints (LDS Church) and a member of the first Utah Territorial Legislature. He spent most of his life working as a farmer.

Groves was a native of Madison County, Kentucky. By the time he was 22 he had moved to Indiana. In 1825, he married Sarah Hogue. They divorced in 1833. At that time he was a Presbyterian. On March 1, 1832, he was baptized by Calvin Beede in Greene County, Indiana.

Groves joined the LDS Church in the early 1830s and was involved in missionary work in Kentucky, Tennessee, and Missouri.  He served as a missionary with Morris Phelps in Calhoun County, Illinois in 1834, where they baptized 16 people. In 1836, Groves married Lucy Simmons. When not on missions, Groves lived in Kirtland, Ohio for a time and then moved to Caldwell County, Missouri in 1836 and to Davies County, Missouri in 1838.

In 1839 Groves settled at Columbus, Illinois. He served a mission in northern Illinois later that year.

In 1840, Groves was one of the earliest LDS missionaries to serve in Wisconsin Territory. He moved to Nauvoo, Illinois in 1842. He continued to often serve missions in various parts of Illinois until 1844. He was involved in the settlement of Mount Pisgah, Iowa in 1846.

He arrived in Utah in 1848 moving southward to Iron County, Utah in 1850 and settling at New Harmony, Utah in what is now Washington County, Utah in 1853.

In Utah Territory, Groves not only served in the territorial legislature but also as the patriarch of the stake in Iron County, Utah.

Notes

References
list of members of the first Utah Territorial legislature
Church History in the Fulness of Times reference to Groves
Scott Faulring article on early marriages performed by elders of the LDS Church
LDS Church Almanac
Lyman, Edward Leo. The Overland Journey from Utah to California: Wagon Travel from the City of Saints to the City of Angels. (Reno: University of Nevada Press, 2004) p. 124
Joseph Smith Papers Project biographical entry on Groves

1797 births
1867 deaths
19th-century Mormon missionaries
American leaders of the Church of Jesus Christ of Latter-day Saints
American Mormon missionaries in the United States
Converts to Mormonism
Members of the Utah Territorial Legislature
19th-century American politicians
Mormon pioneers
Patriarchs (LDS Church)
Latter Day Saints from Illinois
Latter Day Saints from Utah